The Bristol and Exeter Railway 0-4-0T locomotives were two small 0-4-0T locomotives built for shunting by the Bristol and Exeter Railway. On 1 January 1876 the Bristol and Exeter Railway was amalgamated with the Great Western Railway, after which the locomotives were given new numbers.

 91 (1872 – 1880) GWR No. 2094
 92 (1874 – 1881) GWR No. 2095

These were the smallest locomotives built for the Bristol and Exeter Railway, a railway that made great use of tank locomotives, but they were dwarfed by the Pearson singles used on the main line.

These 0-4-0Ts were unique among the railway's broad gauge locomotives in having outside cylinders.

References

 
 

Broad gauge (7 feet) railway locomotives
0-4-0T locomotives
Bristol and Exeter Railway locomotives
Railway locomotives introduced in 1872
Scrapped locomotives